The California Office of Administrative Law (OAL) is the California agency responsible for carrying out the rulemaking part of the California Administrative Procedure Act. It is overseen by the California Government Operations Agency.

The OAL is responsible for publishing the weekly California Regulatory Notice Register and the resulting California Code of Regulations (CCR).

List of directors

References

External links
 Official website
 Office of Administrative Law in the California Code of Regulations

Office of Administrative Law
California administrative law
1979 establishments in California
Government agencies established in 1979